Birgitta Ahlqvist, born 1948, is a Swedish social democratic politician, She was a member of the Riksdag from 1994 to 1995, and then again from 1998 to 2006.

External links
 Birgitta Ahlqvist at the Riksdag website 

1948 births
Living people
People from Skellefteå Municipality
Members of the Riksdag from the Social Democrats
Women members of the Riksdag
Members of the Riksdag 1994–1998
Members of the Riksdag 1998–2002
Members of the Riksdag 2002–2006
20th-century Swedish women politicians
20th-century Swedish politicians
21st-century Swedish women politicians